Boy Harsher is an American electronic music group, formed in 2013 in Savannah, Georgia. Currently based in Northampton, Massachusetts, the band consists of vocalist Jae Matthews and producer Augustus Muller. The band has amassed a cult following since their formation, and their song "Pain" has become an underground hit. Matthews and Muller own and run the label Nude Club, which is exclusively devoted to Boy Harsher and related artists.

History
Knowing each other from film school in Savannah, Muller and Matthews started the project Teen Dreamz in 2013, which acted as a precursor to Boy Harsher. The project consisted of Matthews performing her spoken word pieces and Muller providing a musical backing. Throughout the year, Teen Dreamz's sound became more danceable, as Matthews's vocals developed into a more expressive singing style. The band renamed their project as Boy Harsher in 2014.

Boy Harsher released its home-recorded debut EP, Lesser Man in the same year. Following their relocation to Massachusetts, the band recorded and released its debut album, Yr Body Is Nothing in 2016 on DKA Records. After the release of 2017's Country Girl EP, the band formed their Nude Club imprint in 2018, re-issuing their catalog. One of the first releases on Nude Club, "Pain II", is a reissue of their 2014 single with a remix by The Soft Moon. Their sophomore studio album, 2019's Careful, was backed by an extended reissue of Country Girl as Country Girl Uncut. In that year, a remix album of Careful, titled Careful Remixes, etc. was also released; it featured remixes from techno producers such as Marcel Dettmann and Silent Servant.

On April 10, 2020, Muller released his debut soundtrack album, Machine Learning Experiments (Original Soundtrack), which featured original scores composed for two short adult films, Orgone Theory and Hydra. The album was issued on Nude Club. In 2021, the band remixed the Perfume Genius song "Your Body Changes Everything." The remix was featured in the album, Immediately Remixes. In January 2022, the band's directorial debut film, The Runner, was released with an accompanying soundtrack. The short film starred Kristina Esfandiari.

In January 2023, a US show was announced: the band will play at the Cruel World Festival in Pasadena, California on May 20, 2023.

Musical style, imagery and influences

Boy Harsher is often labeled as a dark wave group, with influences ranging from early forms of industrial to electronic body music. Paul Simpson of AllMusic referred to the band's music as "dark, danceable electro pop" that references synth pop and EBM. He has characterized Boy Harsher's music by its minimal beats and synth textures, as well as by Matthews's dynamic vocals that depict "desire, fantasy, and loneliness." On his review for Careful, Kevin Lozano of Pitchfork listed the band as one of the acts that spearhead the minimal synth scene along with Essaie pas, noting the "brisk drum machine loops, oscillating synths, and Matthews’ haunting incantations" that permeate the album's sound. Lozano has previously described the band as "making coldwave that could turn any space in that quiet town into a seedy nightclub." Michael Lawson of The Skinny thought that the band "straddled the middle ground between melancholic cold wave and regimented synth workouts."

Boy Harsher draws heavily from cinema, theatrics and graphic design to tailor the band's visual imagery; Matthews and Muller both have a background in filmmaking. They have likened the band to the movies Body Heat and Lost Highway, latter of which was directed by David Lynch, a professed influence on the band. Matthews has expressed appreciation for various female vocalists, including Nico, Circuit des Yeux, Alison Lewis of Linea Aspera, Chelsea Wolfe and Zola Jesus, whereas Muller named Sleep Chamber, Suicide, DAF and Yello as early musical influences on Boy Harsher. Gearwise, Muller mostly employs synthesizers and samplers, stating that he "tries and borrows as much [instruments] as he can for recording." On the band's minimal instrumentation, he said: "I’m obsessed with how successful the minimalism is with 80s music. It’s really a masterclass of what can be done with a drum machine and a couple of synths." A "half-functioning" Roland Juno-106 was used extensively on Lesser Man EP; their live set features synth lines sampled into an Akai MPC, as well as backing tracks.

Discography

Studio albums
 Yr Body Is Nothing (2016)
 Careful (2019)
 Country Girl Uncut  (2019)
 The Runner (Original Soundtrack) (2022)

EPs
 Lesser Man (2014)
 Pain (2015)
 Country Girl EP (2017)

Singles
 "Motion" (2017)
 "Country Girl" (2017)
 "Run" (2017)
 "Pain II" (2018)
 "Pain" (The Soft Moon Remix) (2018)
 "Face the Fire" (2018)
 "Fate" (2018)
 "LA" (2019)
 "R.O.V. (New Beat Edit) // Part Time Punks Session" (2020)

Remix album
 Careful Remixes, etc. (2019)

Music videos
 "Deep Well" (2016; dir. Zach Hart)
 "Motion" (2017; dir. MJ Bernier)
 "Country Girl" (2017; dir. Jae Matthews)	
 "Last Days" (2018; dir. Augustus Muller)
 "Face the Fire" (2018; dir. Augustus Muller and Jae Matthews)	
"Fate" (2018; dir. Bryan M. Ferguson)
 "LA" (2019; dir. Kathleen Dycaico and Jill Ferraro)
 "Come Closer" (2019; dir. Muted Widows)	
 "Send Me a Vision" (2019; dir. Augustus Muller)
 "Electric" (2020; dir. Idan Barazani)

In popular culture

Film 
 The 2022 indie horror film Terrifier 2 directed by Damien Leone features the track "Pain" from the 2014's EP Lesser Man. It appears at 1h24'42", during the party scene.

References

External links

 
 Boy Harsher on Bandcamp
 Nude Club Records

2013 establishments in Georgia (U.S. state)
American dark wave musical groups
American industrial music groups
American musical duos
American synth-pop groups
Cold wave groups
Electronic music duos
Electronic music groups from Georgia (U.S. state)
Electropop groups
Minimal wave groups
Musical groups established in 2013
Musical groups from Savannah, Georgia